Sher Afzal (1 January 1841 – 31 December 1923) was a son of Mehtar Shah Muhammad Afzal II of Chitral and a brother of Mehtar Aman ul-Mulk, who lived most of his life in exile in Afghanistan and Badakhshan. He managed to place himself on the Mehtar's seat for a few weeks in the period leading up to the Chitral Expedition.

References

1841 births
Mehtars of Chitral
1922 deaths
Princely rulers of Pakistan
Nawabs of Pakistan